Do Nothing may refer to:

 "Do Nothing" (song), a 1980 single by The Specials included on the album More Specials
 Do Nothing Congress, an epithet applied to the 80th United States Congress (1947–49)
 Do Nothing Farming, an ecological farming approach established by Masanobu Fukuoka (1913–2008)
 Do nothing grinder (AKA Kentucky do-nothing, or do nothing machine), a novelty or toy version of the Trammel of Archimedes, which draws an ellipse
 Do nothing instruction (AKA NOP or NOOP), in computer programming
 Do nothing kings, English name for the rois fainéants of the later kings of the Merovingian dynasty (7th and 8th centuries AD)

See also 
 Do (disambiguation)
 DO (disambiguation)
 D0 (disambiguation) (D followed by zero)
 Doe (disambiguation)
 Doo (disambiguation)
 Doh (disambiguation)
 Do Nothing till You Hear from Me (disambiguation)